"Secrets of Love" is a 2006 pop song performed as a duet by Swiss singer DJ BoBo and German singer Sandra. The song was written and produced by DJ BoBo and Axel Breitung.

It was released on 3 March 2006 to promote DJ BoBo's compilation Greatest Hits and was a commercial success, peaking at no. 5 in Switzerland and no. 13 in Germany. The music video was directed by Robert Bröllochs and filmed in Disneyland Paris.

Formats and track listings
 CD single
"Secrets of Love" (Radio Version) — 3:17
"Secrets of Love" (Club Mix Radio Edit) — 3:59

 CD maxi single
"Secrets of Love" (Radio Version) — 3:17
"Secrets of Love" (Club Mix Radio Edit) — 3:59
"Secrets of Love" (Club Mix) — 6:42
"Secrets of Love" (Instrumental) — 3:19
"Secrets of Love" (Video) — 3:19

Charts

Weekly charts

Year-end charts

References

External links
 "Secrets of Love" at Discogs

2006 singles
2006 songs
DJ BoBo songs
Sandra (singer) songs
Songs written by Axel Breitung
Songs written by DJ BoBo
Male–female vocal duets